Kparblee District is one of 17 Administrative Districts of Nimba County, Liberia.  In 2008, the population was 11,424. It is located in Tappita Statutory District and situated along the Cestos River which borders Liberia with the Republic of Côte d'Ivoire, commonly called the Ivory Coast.

People and Government
The district is mainly composed of two ethnic groups, the majority being Krahn and the minority being Gio. The first Commissioner of the District since its declaration in 2003 was Hon. Alexander N. Tenty Sr. from Dewoblee, of the Zodru Chiefdom. He served from July 2004 – 2010. The current Commissioner is Hon. Alexander Tenty, Sr who took over from Hon. Emmanuel N. Kar is from Kparblee town after the 2011 election. The headquarters of Kparblee Administrative District is Youkorway Old Town which has a population of a little over two thousand people. The only security found in the District is the Immigration with their office in Behwalay. A magisterial court was established sometimes in 2014 and is seated in Yourpea New Town. Current, Behwalay is among those rural cities to enjoy city status.

Towns
The District is composed of fifteen larger towns with seven smaller villages. Towns within Kparblee Administrative District are:
Youkorway
Beatuo
New Yourpea Town
Behwalay
Dubuzon
Kaylay
Dewoblee I
Dewoblee II
Kparblee Town
Zodru Town
Gueyea Gbayee-blee
Bah-blee
Karn-blee
Gayeplay
Tuzon
Yeah-blee
Tiah-blee

Religion and Culture
The first religious group to visit the District and become established is the Mid-Baptist. The missionaries were Teacher Walkins, Teacher Homes, and Teacher Crocmanaul along with Rev Sawi Kpou in the Town of Kparblee during the early 1950s. Due to the missionaries' visit and decision to establish a church in the Chiefdom at the time, all cultural and traditional practices were abolished by the citizens.

Transportation
A road was first built in the District in 1975 by Sika and since then has not been rehabilitated. While the transporting of chiefs, messengers and security personnel was still going on in the District at the time it was a chiefdom, the whole idea was discouraged by a young graduate from the BWI called Jonathan V. Dayee from Kparblee Town in 1976.

Institutions
One of the oldest institutions in the district is Kweyeah Memorial Institute (KMI) in Kparblee. Currently, the District has about nine schools of which two are full Junior High. According to the government MDA 2008-2012, Kweyeah Memorial Institute should be a Full High School while the Samuel Kayon Doe in Youkorway Old Town the Headquarters be a Technical High School.

Agriculture
Prior to the war, Kparblee District was one of Nimba County's strong hopes for agricultural products such as cocoa, coffee, plantains, etc. According to the Commissioner, the district was able to benefit some $100,000 USD in a grant project from the government which is intended for agricultural activities. The project began sometime in February 2012 with Kparblee town benefiting from the entire $100,000.

Elections
Kparblee District now forms part of the Electoral District number six in Nimba County after the demarcation exercise conducted by the National Elections Commission (NEC) in 2011. According to the results of the 2011 Voter's Registration exercise, Kparble District registered about 5,741 voters. Other communities which make up the district along with Kparblee are the Boe and Quilla Administrative District, and the Gblor and Gbear Chiefdom. Kparblee shares boundaries with these mentioned communities. Due to the ongoing civil crises in La Cote Ivoire, Kparblee has received a total of six thousand Ivorian refugees.

The citizens of Kpablee Administrative District residing in Monrovia and its environs have once again gathered to move the district forward. According to the Chairman of the Kparblee District Development Association (KPADDA), the organization will be conducting its first general elections with a completed constitution. The organization has set up an Electoral Commission and those on the commission are as follows:
 Hon. Moses B. Zayee Sr. Chairman
 Hon. Ruth J. Barshell Co-Chairman
 Mr. Chris Nyonton Nezzola Secretary
 Hon. Jackson Paye Commissioner
 Hon. Marcus Sawi Kpou Technical Consultant/ Commissioner.

Those on the constitution committee are:
 Hon Steve W. Weah Chairman
 Hon. Chris Nyonton Nezzola Co-Chairman
 Mr. Clarence B. Dennis Secretary
 Hon. Marcus Sawi Kpou Advisor 
 Hon. N. Harrison Wondy Member
 Hon. Vera Barshell Member
 Hon. David Wounuah Member.
After the organization conducted its first general election and brought on board the following personalities as leaders:
Hon. Peter S. Karngbaye, Sr-Chairman
Hon Thompson Z. Gaylah-Co-Chairman Administrator
Hon. Dale Rex George-Co-Chairman Operation
Mr. Beh Othello Paye-General Secretary
Mr. Floyd N. Foirjolo-Assistant Gen. Secretary
Mad. Precious Gaye-Financial Secretary
Mad. Mama Dennis-Treasurer
Evan. William Youdee- Chaplain

References

 

Districts of Liberia
Nimba County